Kim Min-hee is a Korean name consisting of the family name Kim and the given name Min-hee, and may also refer to:

 Kim Min-hee (actress, born 1972), South Korean actress
 Kim Min-hee (actress, born 1982), South Korean actress